Nordell may refer to:

 Anna Nordell
 Jessica Nordell
 Vera Rózsa-Nordell
 (Hans) Roderick Nordell
 G.E. Nordell, author & philosopher of New Mexico, USA
 Nordell Family USA official website (est. 2009)

Surnames